Bad Bascomb is a 1946 American western film starring Wallace Beery and Margaret O'Brien.  The movie was directed by S. Sylvan Simon. The supporting cast features Marjorie Main, J. Carrol Naish, Frances Rafferty, Marshall Thompson and Henry O'Neill.

Plot
"Bad" Bascomb is a notorious outlaw wanted by federal marshals after outwitting every group sent to capture him. He and fellow bandit Bart Yancey, a cold-blooded killer, have again eluded the marshals by joining a Mormon wagon train heading to Utah. They pretend to be helpful, and Bascomb becomes fond of an admiring little girl who attaches herself to him played by O'Brien. Beery eventually distances himself from Yancey by thwarting an attempted robbery and then saves the wagon train from an attack by Indians by riding to get help, before being taken captive by the marshal at the end of the movie.

Cast
 Wallace Beery as Zed Bascomb
 Margaret O'Brien as Emmy
 Marjorie Main as Abbey Hanks
 J. Carrol Naish as Bart Yancey
 Frances Rafferty as Dora McCabe
 Russell Simpson as Elijah Walker 
 Marshall Thompson as Jimmy Holden
 Henry O'Neill as Governor Winton
 Sara Haden as Tillie Lovejoy
 Frank Darien as Elder Moab McCabe 
 Stanley Andrews as Col. Cartright (uncredited) 
 Joseph Crehan as Gov. Ames (uncredited)

Reception
According to MGM records the film earned $2,384,000 in the US and Canada and $1,261,000 elsewhere, leading to an overall profit of $648,000.

See also
The other six Wallace Beery and Marjorie Main films:
 Wyoming (1940)
 Barnacle Bill (1941)
 Jackass Mail (1942)
 The Bugle Sounds (1942)
 Rationing (1944)
 Big Jack (1949)

References

External links
 
 
 
 
 Review of film at Variety

1946 films
1946 Western (genre) films
1940s English-language films
Films directed by S. Sylvan Simon
Mormonism in fiction
Metro-Goldwyn-Mayer films
American Western (genre) films
American black-and-white films
1940s American films